The 14th District of the Iowa House of Representatives in the state of Iowa.

Current elected officials
Steve Hansen is the representative currently representing the district.

Past representatives
The district has previously been represented by:
 Dale L. Tieden, 1971–1973
 William B. Griffee, 1973–1979
 James Johnson, 1979–1983
 Dale M. Cochran, 1983–1987
 Janet Adams, 1987–1993
 J. Norman Mundie, 1993–2001
 George Eichhorn, 2001–2003
 Mark Kuhn, 2003–2011
 Joshua Byrnes, 2011–2013
 David Dawson, 2013–2017
 Timothy Kacena, 2017–2021
 Steve Hansen, 2021–present

References

014